Cat Music is a record label based in Bucharest, Romania, that holds 30% of the market share and a catalog of more than 8,500 songs. Its YouTube channel is the most popular of a Romanian label, with over 6.2 million subscribers and 6.2 billion views.

Dan Gheorghe Popi, CEO of Cat Music, was the president of the Union of Phonogram Producers in Romania and was listed in 2004 in Billboard's Top 20 Best Independent Artist and Repertoire Managers. It was founded in 1991 by Dan Popi and has a market share of 30 percent in Romania. Internationally successful artists of Cat Music were O-Zone (Dragostea din tei), Cleopatra Stratan (Ghiță) and Edward Maya feat. Vika Jigulina (Stereo Love).

In 2019, Cat Music opened its first international branch in Madrid, Spain.

Major artists 
 
 3rei Sud Est
 Andreea Bănică
 Lidia Buble
 Faydee
 Feli  
 Elena Gheorghe 
 Havana
 Jo
 Kamelia
 Anna Lesko
 Delia Matache
 Alex Mica
 MIRA
 DJ Project
 Randi
 Ruby
 DJ Sava
 Adrian Sînă
 Pavel Stratan
 Uddi
 Voltaj
 What's UP

Eurovision artists 
 
 Ilinca Băcilă 
 Mandinga  
 Ester Peony
 Bella Santiago
 Voltaj

Cat Music Spain artists  
 
 Descemer Bueno
 Mirela Cabero 
 Jorge González 
 Juan Magán

Other artists   
 
 Nyanda 
 Markus Schulz 
 Mohombi

References

External links 
 
 
 

1991 establishments in Romania
Record labels established in 1991
Romanian music
Romanian record labels